The 1982 Texas Longhorns baseball team represented the University of Texas at Austin in the 1982 NCAA Division I baseball season. The Longhorns played their home games at Disch–Falk Field. The team was coached by Cliff Gustafson in his 15th season at Texas.

The Longhorns reached the College World Series, finishing fourth with wins over Oklahoma State and Stanford and losses to eventual champion Miami (FL) and runner-up Wichita State.

Personnel

Roster

Schedule and results

References

Texas Longhorns baseball seasons
Texas Longhorns
Southwest Conference baseball champion seasons
College World Series seasons
Texas Longhorns
Southwest Conference Baseball Tournament champion seasons